Phan Văn Tài Em (born April 23, 1982 in Châu Thành District, Long An) is a retired Vietnamese footballer who last played as a midfielder for Đồng Tâm Long An. He was a member of the Vietnam national football team. He was awarded as the Vietnamese Golden Ball in 2005.

Discovered by Henrique Calisto in 2002, he, since then, became a regular starter in the national team. He has played for the U-23 Vietnam in the 2005 Southeast Asian Games and 2007 Southeast Asian Games. In 2007, he was chosen to play for the national team in the 2007 Asian Cup.

In 2008, Em, along with Nguyễn Minh Phương, captained Vietnam to win the 2008 AFF Suzuki Cup.

He spent most of his career in Gach Đồng Tâm Long An, but he had considered a move to Navibank Sài Gòn F.C.

After the retirement of Nguyễn Minh Phương, Phan Văn Tài Em was handed the captain band of the Vietnam national football team by the new coach Falko Goetz.

In September 2016 Phan Văn Tài Em announced that he was retiring from football.

International goals

Honours

Club
Long An F.C.
V.League 1: 
 Champions     : 2005, 2006
 Runner-up     : 2003, 2007, 2008
 Third place   : 2004
Vietnamese Super Cup: 
 Champions     : 2006
 Runner-up     : 2005
Vietnamese National Cup: 
 Champions     : 2005
 Runner-up     : 2006
V.League 2:
 Champions     : 2001-2002, 2012
Xuân Thành Sài Gòn F.C.
Vietnamese National Cup: 
 Champions     : 2012
Navibank Sài Gòn F.C.
Vietnamese National Cup: 
 Champions     : 2011

International
Vietnam U23
 Silver Southeast Asian Games     : 2003, 2005 
Vietnam
 Champion  AFF Championship: 2008
 Third place AFF Championship     : 2002

Individuals
 Vietnamese Golden Ball: 2005
 Best Young Player of Vietnam Football Federation: 2004

References

External links
 Player profile - dongtamfc.com

1982 births
Living people
Vietnamese footballers
People from Long An Province
Association football midfielders
Vietnam international footballers
2007 AFC Asian Cup players
V.League 1 players
Footballers at the 2002 Asian Games
Navibank Sài Gòn FC players
Southeast Asian Games silver medalists for Vietnam
Southeast Asian Games medalists in football
Competitors at the 2003 Southeast Asian Games
Competitors at the 2005 Southeast Asian Games
Asian Games competitors for Vietnam